The Soča ( in Slovene) or Isonzo ( in Italian; other names , ,  or ) is a  long river that flows through western Slovenia and northeastern Italy.

The river runs past the towns of Bovec, Kobarid, Tolmin, Kanal ob Soči, Nova Gorica (where it is crossed by the Solkan Bridge), and Gorizia, entering the Adriatic Sea close to the town of Monfalcone. It has a nival-pluvial regime in its upper course and pluvial-nival in its lower course.

Prior to the First World War, the river ran parallel to the border between Kingdom of Italy and the Austro-Hungarian Empire. During World War I, it was the scene of bitter fighting between the two countries, culminating in the Battle of Caporetto in 1917.

Name
The river was recorded in antiquity as Aesontius, Sontius, and Isontius. Later attestations include super Sontium (in 507–11), a flumine Isontio (1028), in Lisonçum (1261), an die Ysnicz (1401), and an der Snicz (ca. 1440). The Slovene name Soča is derived from the form *Sǫťa, which was borrowed from Latin (and Romance) Sontius. In turn, this is probably based on the substrate name *Aisontia, presumably derived from the PIE root * 'swift, rushing', referring to a quickly moving river. Another possible origin is the pre-Romance root * 'water, river'.

Major changes in the watershed

The present course of the river is the result of several dramatic changes that occurred during the past 2,000 years. According to the Roman historian Strabo, the river named Aesontius, which in Roman times flowed past Aquileia to the Adriatic Sea, was essentially the Natisone and Torre river system.

In 585, a landslide cut off the upper part of the Natisone riverbed, causing its avulsion and subsequent stream capture by the Bontius River. The original subterranean discharge of the Bontius into the Timavo became obstructed, and another avulsion returned the new watercourse into the bed of the lower Natisone.

During the next centuries the estuary of this new river—the Soča—moved eastward until it captured the short coastal river Sdobba, through which the Isonzo now discharges into the Adriatic Sea. The former estuary (of the Aesontius, and the early Isonzo) in the newly formed lagoon of Grado became an independent coastal rivulet.

Attractions
Due to its emerald-green water, the river is marketed as "The Emerald Beauty." It is said to be one of the rare rivers in the world that retain such a colour throughout their length. Giuseppe Ungaretti, one of the greatest Italian poets, describes the Isonzo in the poem "The Rivers."

The river inspired the poet Simon Gregorčič to write his best-known poem Soči (To the Soča), one of the masterpieces of Slovene poetry. This region served as a location for the 2008 Disney film Chronicles of Narnia: Prince Caspian.

The river is also well known for the marble trout (Salmo marmoratus); this species is native to rivers of the northern Adriatic basin, and it lives in the upper course of the river. This species is endangered due to the introduction of other non-indigenous trout species sometime between World War I and World War II.

Significance in World War I

The valley was the stage of major military operations including the twelve battles of the Isonzo on the Italian front in World War I between May 1915 and November 1917, in which over half a million Austro-Hungarian and Italian soldiers lost their lives.

The Isonzo campaign comprised the following battles:

First Battle of the Isonzo: 23 June – 7 July 1915
Second Battle of the Isonzo: 18 July – 3 August 1915
Third Battle of the Isonzo : 18 October – 3 November 1915
Fourth Battle of the Isonzo: 10 November – 2 December 1915
Fifth Battle of the Isonzo: 9–17 March 1916
Sixth Battle of the Isonzo: 6–17 August 1916
Seventh Battle of the Isonzo: 14–17 September 1916
Eighth Battle of the Isonzo: 10–12 October 1916
Ninth Battle of the Isonzo: 1–4 November 1916
Tenth Battle of the Isonzo: 12 May – 8 June 1917
Eleventh Battle of the Isonzo: 19 August – 12 September 1917
Twelfth Battle of the Isonzo: 24 October – 7 November 1917, also known as the Battle of Caporetto

See also
 Karst topography
 Battles of the Isonzo
 Gorizia
 Goriška

References

External links

 Condition of Soča at Log Čezsoški  and Solkan  - graphs, in the following order, of water level, flow and temperature data for the past 30 days (taken in Log Čezsoški and Solkan by ARSO)
 The Walks of Peace in the Soča Region Foundation. The Foundation preserves, restores and presents the historical and cultural heritage of the First World War in the area of the Isonzo Front for the study, tourist and educational purposes. 
 Galleries of Soca river in kayak
Awarded "EDEN - European Destinations of Excellence" non traditional tourist destination 2008

 
 
Rivers of Italy
Rivers of the Province of Gorizia
Rivers of the Slovene Littoral
Waterways of Italy
International rivers of Europe
Rivers of the Julian Alps
Braided rivers in Europe